Matthew Cronin may refer to:
Matt Cronin, a 21st-century baseball pitcher for the Washington Nationals
Matthew T. Cronin, a 20th-century mayor of Bayonne, New Jersey